GPS Portland Phoenix is an American soccer team based in Portland, Maine. Founded in 2009, the team plays in USL League Two, the fourth tier of the American Soccer Pyramid, in the Northeast Division of the Eastern Conference.

The team plays its home games at Memorial Stadium on the campus of Deering High School. The team's colors are sky blue, white and black.

History
The Phoenix acquired their PDL franchise rights from the now-defunct Cape Cod Crusaders, the PDL national champions in 2002 and 2003 who left the league at the end of the 2008 season. They are part of the larger Maine Premier Soccer ("MPS") organization, which was founded in 2009 as a sister company to Massachusetts Premier Soccer, with a mission to develop aspiring professional soccer players and coaches in Maine.

The team played its first official game on May 9, 2010, a 3–0 victory over the Westchester Flames. The first goal in franchise history was scored by Chris Banks.

Global Premier Soccer rebranded the team GPS Portland Phoenix in 2012.

Players

Current roster

Notable former players
This list of notable former players comprises players who went on to play professional soccer after playing for the team in the Premier Development League, or those who previously played professionally before joining the team.

Year-by-year

Honors
 USL PDL Northeast Division Champions 2011
 USL PDL Northeast Division Champions 2015
 USL PDL Northeast Division Champions 2016

Head coaches
  Alistair Bain (2010–2016)

Stadia
 Memorial Field at Deering High School; Portland, Maine (2010–present)
 Stadium at Scarborough High School; Scarborough, Maine 2 games (2010–2011)
 Stadium at Windham High School; Windham, Maine 1 game (2010)

Average attendance

Attendance stats are calculated by averaging each team's self-reported home attendances from the historical match archive.

 2010: 426
 2011: 483
 2012: 550
 2013: 584
 2014: 525
 2015: 512

References

External links
Official Site
Official PDL site

Association football clubs established in 2009
USL League Two teams
Soccer clubs in Maine
Sports in Portland, Maine
2009 establishments in Maine